Eugene Salamin is a mathematician who discovered (independently with Richard Brent) the Salamin–Brent algorithm, used in high-precision calculation of pi.

Eugene Salamin worked on alternatives to increase accuracy and minimize computational processes through the use of quaternions.
Benefits may include: 
 the design of spatio-temporal databases;
 numerical mathematical methods that traditionally prove unsuccessful due to buildup of computational error;
 therefore, may be applied to applications involving genetic algorithms and evolutionary computation, in general.

Publications

See also 
 HAKMEM

References 

20th-century American mathematicians
Year of birth missing